Okuma or Ōkuma may refer to:

Surname
Ōkuma Shigenobu (大隈重信) (1838 – 1922) 8th and 17th Prime Minister of Japan, founder of Waseda University
Enuka Okuma, Canadian actress of Nigerian descent

Other uses
Okuma Corporation, a manufacturer of CNC turning and milling machines
Ōkuma, Fukushima (大熊町; -machi), a town located in Futaba District, Fukushima Prefecture, Japan
Ōkuma Station (逢隈駅), a JR East railway station located in Watari, Miyagi Prefecture, Japan

Japanese-language surnames